The 1981 Lliga Catalana de Bàsquet was the second edition of the Catalan Basketball League. The competitionwas contested by six teams and the title game take place in the Palau dels Esports of Barcelona.

Regular season

Standings

Results

Semifinals

|}

Final

References

Lliga Catalana de Bàsquet seasons
 
Spanish